The Blinovitch Limitation Effect is a fictional principle of time travel physics in the universe of the long-running British science fiction television series Doctor Who.

It is usually understood as having two aspects: firstly, that a time traveller cannot "redo" an act that they have previously committed, and secondly, that a dangerous energy discharge will result if two temporal versions of the same person come into contact.

The effect was introduced in Day of the Daleks (1972), when Jo Grant asks the Third Doctor why a group of time-travelling guerrillas on a mission to assassinate a diplomat cannot simply go back into the past and try again if they fail. In reply, the Doctor cites the principle and begins to explain, but is interrupted before he can go any further.  The effect was invented by script editor Terrance Dicks and producer Barry Letts to gloss over the plot problems inherent in the time travel premise of the serial.  The interruption introduced by the writers meant that the explanation did not have to be expanded upon.

The Effect is next mentioned in Invasion of the Dinosaurs (1974), where the Third Doctor states that it "tends to limit research into time travel" but, once again, he does not go into detail as to why. The novelisation of the story reveals that Blinovitch was a "great bear of a man from Russia" who had reversed his own timestream, reverting to infancy.

The next time the effect is mentioned on-screen is in Mawdryn Undead (1983), but there it is not a scientific principle that prevents people from redoing their actions (for whatever reason). Rather, it is a physical effect that occurs when two versions of the same person from different time periods make physical contact. This results in an energy discharge, shorting out the "time differential" between them. The Mawdryn Undead storyline establishes that the younger version of the character involved in the discharge, Brigadier Lethbridge-Stewart, is traumatized by the event and, for the next several years, loses his memory of the Doctor.

It is possible, however, as Lawrence Miles and Tat Wood theorise in their reference book About Time 5, that the energy discharge is simply a side effect of the effect's operation. It also appears, given the number of times that the Doctor has met his other incarnations, that the effect does not apply to Time Lords or, at the very least, can be mitigated. The Doctor appears to show sensitivity and resistance to temporal distortions, notably in The Time Monster (1972), Invasion of the Dinosaurs and City of Death (1979) (where Romana does as well).

Companion Amelia "Amy" Pond, an apparent human, repeatedly demonstrates an immunity to the effect, which is neither explained nor seemingly even noticed by the Doctor. Adult Amy takes adolescent Amelia's hand and pulls her from danger in the museum in "The Big Bang" (2010). Adult Amy also describes to the Doctor in "Good Night" (2011) her childhood memory of receiving an ice cream from a woman whom she suddenly realizes was herself, and walks out of the TARDIS to buy young Amelia the same ice cream. When Amy aggressively flirts with her approximately one minute older self in "Time" (2011), the Doctor does not warn her not to touch, despite them being mere inches from each other and the Doctor noticing her husband Rory's obvious excitement at the possibilities (the same reaction displayed by their daughter, at the prospect of two simultaneous instances of the Doctor, in both "A Good Man Goes to War" (2011) and "Last Night" (2011)). Conversely, companions Rose Tyler and Sarah Jane Smith are careful not to touch their infant selves in, respectively, "Father's Day" (2005) and The Temptation of Sarah Jane Smith (2008).

The Virgin New Adventures novel Timewyrm: Revelation (1991) by Paul Cornell gave Blinovitch the first name of Aaron (and the title of his book as Temporal Mechanics). The Virgin Missing Adventures novelisation The Ghosts of N-Space (1995) by Barry Letts stated that Blinovitch formulated his principle in the British Museum's reading room in 1928, and although he was not the first to discuss it, he was the first to formulate it properly.

In "Kill the Moon", the Doctor mentions that in Courtney Woods's future, before becoming the President of the United States, "she met this bloke called Blinovitch".

Popular culture
Blinovitch is mentioned a number of times (presumably as an in-joke for Doctor Who viewers) in the romantic comedy Happy Accidents (2000), which has a plot involving time travel. In the film, Blinovitch is said to have been from "Yugoserbia" and discovered how to bend spacetime.  Two of his laws are invoked:
 "Blinovitch's Second Law of Temporal Inertia" apparently states that is impossible to time travel in your own lifetime. One can only time travel to the distant past, and only small changes in history are possible, which will "dampen out" by the time they reach the relative present.
 "Blinovitch's Fifth Law of Causal Determination" resolves (in an unspecified manner) all paradoxes involved with time travel.

References

Doctor Who concepts
Time travel in television
Fictional science